The Organization of Artisans' Unity (OAU) is one of two primary trade union affiliates of the National Trade Unions Confederation in Mauritius. Based in the tea and sugar industries, the OAU also represents workers in the textile, as well as hotel and catering sectors.

References 

Trade unions in Mauritius